John Begg, commonly known as Jack Begg (20 September 1866 – 23 February 1937), was a Scottish architect, who practised in London, South Africa and India, before returning to Scotland to teach at Edinburgh College of Art from 1922 to 1933.

Life

He was born in Bo'ness the third son of John Begg (1826–1878), an ironmonger and JP. He was educated at Edinburgh Academy, 1879–1883.

He trained under Hippolyte Blanc and was later employed first by Alfred Waterhouse and later by Sir Robert William Edis.

In 1896 he was appointed architect to the Real Estate Company of South Africa and moved to Johannesburg. He returned to Scotland due to the Boer War.

He arrived in India in 1901 as Consulting Architect to Bombay. In 1906 he became Consulting Architect to the Government of India. He, with George Wittet, was responsible for the evolution of the Indo-Saracenic style of architecture. Begg's best-known building is the General Post Office in Bombay.

He returned to Scotland in 1921 and went into partnership with Alexander Lorne Campbell, but never enjoyed the success or scale of projects which he had enjoyed in India.

In 1922 he adopted the role of Head of Architecture at the Edinburgh College of Art. During his period there he brought in Frank Mears to teach under him.

He served as President of the Royal Incorporation of Architects in Scotland in 1932.

He died in 1937 and is buried in the Grange Cemetery, near its south-east corner, with an exceptionally modest stone. The stone was restored in 2018. His wife, Edith Mary Dods Espie (1864–1920) was killed in a fire in their home and is buried with him.

Principal works

York Buildings, Johannesburg (1898)
General Post Office, Bombay (1903)
Customs House, Princes Dock, Bombay (1904)
Medical College, Calcutta (1911)
Printing & Publishing Enterprise, Rangoon, Burma (1912)
General Post Office, Agra (1912)
Stationery Office, Calcutta (1912)
Lady Hardinge Medical Hospital and College, Delhi (1913)
General Post Office, Nagpur (1913)
Custom House, Rangoon, Burma (1915)
High Court, Varanasi (1915)
Law Courts, Benares (1915)
Robertson College Jabalpur (1915)
Central Provinces Council Chamber, Nagpur (1917)
Central Telegraph Office, Rangoon, Burma (1917)

References

External links
John Begg
John Begg, Dictionary of Scottish Architects]

1866 births
1937 deaths
People from Bo'ness
Academic staff of Sir J. J. School of Art
Architecture educators
Edinburgh College of Art
British people in colonial India
People educated at Edinburgh Academy
20th-century Scottish architects
Burials at the Grange Cemetery